The theca folliculi comprise a layer of the ovarian follicles. They appear as the follicles become secondary follicles.

The theca are divided into two layers, the theca interna and the theca externa.

Theca cells are a group of endocrine cells in the ovary made up of connective tissue surrounding the follicle. They have many diverse functions, including promoting folliculogenesis and recruitment of a single follicle during ovulation. Theca cells and granulosa cells together form the stroma of the ovary.

Androgen synthesis 

Theca cells are responsible for synthesizing androgens, providing signal transduction between granulosa cells and oocytes during development by the establishment of a vascular system, providing nutrients, and providing structure and support to the follicle as it matures. 

Theca cells are responsible for the production of androstenedione, and indirectly the production of 17β estradiol, also called E2, by supplying the neighboring granulosa cells with androstenedione that with the help of the enzyme aromatase can be used as a substrate for this type of estradiol. FSH induces the granulosa cells to synthesize aromatase, an enzyme that converts the androgens made by the theca interna into estradiol.

Signaling cascade 
Gonadotropin releasing hormone (GnRH) is released by projections of the hypothalamus into the anterior pituitary gland. Gonadotrophs are stimulated to produce follicle-stimulating hormone (FSH) and luteinizing hormone (LH), which are released into the bloodstream to act upon the ovaries. Luteinizing hormone serves to directly stimulate theca cells. Together, these organs comprise the HPG axis.

Within the ovaries, transmembrane G-protein coupled receptors (GPCRs) bind to LH in the bloodstream, and the signal is transduced to the interior of theca cells through the action of the second messenger cAMP and third messenger protein kinase A (PKA). Theca cells are then stimulated to produce testosterone, which is sent in a paracrine fashion to neighboring granulosa cells for conversion to estradiol.

Disorders 
Hyperactivity of theca cells causes hyperandrogenism, and hypoactivity leads to a lack of estrogen. Granulosa cell tumors, while rare (less than 5% of ovarian cancers), may both granulosa cells and theca cells. Thecomas are benign proliferations of theca cells that may present with hormonal dysfunction.

Theca cells (along with granulosa cells) form the corpus luteum during oocyte maturation. Theca cells are only correlated with developing ovarian follicles. They are the leading cause of endocrine-based infertility, as either hyperactivity or hypoactivity of the theca cells can lead to fertility problems.

Folliculogenesis 

In human adult females, the primordial follicle is composed of a single oocyte surrounded by a layer of closely associated granulosa cells. In early stages of the ovarian cycle, the developing follicle acquires a layer of connective tissue and associated blood vessels. This covering is called the theca.

As development of the secondary follicle progresses, granulosa cells proliferate to form the multilayered membrana granulosum. Over a period of months, the granulosa cells and thecal cells secrete antral fluid (a mixture of hormones, enzymes, and anticoagulants) to nourish the maturing ovum.

In tertiary follicles, the single-layered theca differentiates into a theca interna and theca externa. The theca interna contains glandular cells and many small blood vessels, while the theca externa is composed of dense connective tissue and larger blood vessels.

See also
 ovary
 theca
 thecoma
 polycystic ovarian syndrome (PCOS)
dehydroepiandrosterone sulfate (DHEAS)
luteinizing hormone (LH)
follicle-stimulating hormone (FSH)

References

External links
 
  - "Mammal, canine ovary (LM, High)"
  - "Mammal, bovine ovary (LM, Medium)"
  - interna
  - externa
 
 Slide at trinity.edu

Mammal female reproductive system
Steroid hormone secreting cells